Predgorny (masculine), Predgornaya (feminine), or Predgornoye (neuter) is the name of several rural localities in Russia:
Predgorny, Biysky District, Altai Krai, a settlement in Srostinsky Selsoviet of Biysky District of Altai Krai
Predgorny, Zmeinogorsky District, Altai Krai, a settlement in Kuzminsky Selsoviet of Zmeinogorsky District of Altai Krai
Predgorny, Krasnodar Krai, a settlement in Seversky Rural Okrug of Seversky District of Krasnodar Krai
Predgorny, Krasnoyarsk Krai, a settlement in Stepnovsky Selsoviet of Nazarovsky District of Krasnoyarsk Krai
Predgornoye, Karachay–Cherkess Republic, a selo in Urupsky District of the Karachay–Cherkess Republic
Predgornoye, Republic of North Ossetia–Alania, a selo in Predgornensky Rural Okrug of Mozdoksky District of the Republic of North Ossetia–Alania